Kärsa may refer to:

Kärsa, Lääne-Viru County, village in Väike-Maarja Parish, Lääne-Viru County, Estonia
Kärsa, Põlva County, village in Põlva Parish, Põlva County, Estonia

See also
Karsa (disambiguation)